Topalu is a commune located on the right bank of the Danube in Constanța County, Northern Dobruja, Romania.

Administration
The commune includes two villages:
 Topalu
 Capidava (historical names: Calichioi)

Demographics
At the 2011 census, Topalu had 1,707 Romanians (99.94%), 1 others (0.06%).

History

Tabula Peutingeriana 
Capidava is depicted in the form Calidava/Calidaua in Segmentum VIII of Tabula Peutingeriana (1st-4th century AD) on a Roman road between Axiopolis and Carsium. The map provides accurate data on the distances between Axiopolis, Capidava and Carsium. These distances coincide with the distances between the present localities of Hinog - Capidava and Capidava - Hârșova. This is also verified by the discovery of military marking pillar at Seimenii Mici that indicates the distance of 18,000 feet (27 km)  from Axiopolis to Capidava.

Ancient times 

The village Capidava is the site of the fortified Geto-Dacian center with the same name, Capidava.

After the Roman conquest of Dacia it became a Roman city and castra in the province of Scythia Minor (modern Dobruja).

Etymology 
Capidava is a Getic toponym, meaning the "curve fortified settlement".

See also 
 Dacia
 Roman Dacia
 List of ancient towns in Scythia Minor
 List of ancient cities in Thrace and Dacia
 Dacian davae

References

Further reading 

 
 Early Byzantine Capidava
 Official Capidava Archaeological Site
 Official Capidava Fortress Site at Constanţa County Council
 Capidava at Encyclopedia Dacica
 Capidava at Turism Constanţa hosted by The Public Office for Tourism, Commerce and 					Public Services, part of the Constanţa County Council
 Capidava hosted by the Romanian National Institute of Historical Monuments
 Capidava article at ziare.com

External links 

 Official Capidava Archaeological Site
 Official Capidava Fortress Site at Constanţa County Council
 Capidava at Encyclopedia Dacica
 Capidava at Turism Constanţa hosted by The Public Office for Tourism, Commerce and 					Public Services, part of the Constanţa County Council
 Capidava hosted by the Romanian National Institute of Historical Monuments
 Capidava article at ziare.com

Communes in Constanța County
Localities in Northern Dobruja
Populated places on the Danube
Dacian towns
Archaeological sites in Romania
Ruins in Romania
Place names of Turkish origin in Romania